Repvåg is a small fishing village in Nordkapp Municipality in Troms og Finnmark county, Norway.  The village is located along the western shore of the Porsangerfjorden on the mainland Porsanger Peninsula.    

The fishing village now has about 14 residents, but historically, it was one of the main ports and trading places in Finnmark county, especially during the Pomor trade with Russia which existed until the 1917 revolution in Russia.  Repvåg Chapel is located in the village, serving the people in the southern part of Nordkapp municipality.

Slightly outside of Repvåg, there is a small area called Stranda, meaning "Beach" in English (formerly "Finneby" or "Sáamisiida" in Northern Sámi) that had a large coastal Sami population and is the last area in the municipality that is still characterized by some coastal Sami culture.

References

Villages in Finnmark
Nordkapp
Populated places of Arctic Norway